Pieter Jan Brugge (born 6 November 1955) is a Dutch film producer.

He was born in Deventer, Netherlands. In 1979, he graduated from the Netherlands Film and Television Academy in Amsterdam, and was subsequently awarded a scholarship by the Dutch Ministry of Cultural Affairs to study in the United States at the AFI Conservatory (AFI), and earned the Master of Fine Arts in AFI.

He has worked frequently with the following directors: Edward Zwick, Alan J. Pakula, and Michael Mann.

He directed The Clearing in 2004, and acted in 127 Hours in 2010.

Filmography

References

External links 
 

1955 births
AFI Conservatory alumni
Dutch film producers
Dutch film directors
People from Deventer
Dutch emigrants to the United States
Living people